= Rock Stadium =

Emirati proposed football stadium

Rock Stadium was a proposed football stadium based in Al Ain, United Arab Emirates.

== History ==
With the aim of increasing tourism and to capitalize on the rising status of football, the Emirati government made a plan to create a unique football stadium.

Rock Stadium was designed by MZ Architects, a firm with locations in countries including Lebanon, Qatar, and the United Arab Emirates. MZ Architects initially wanted to build the stadium in the desert, but after visiting the mountain, which reminded them of an Ancient Greek amphitheater, they decided to designed a stadium with natural hills for seats and a cave-like entrance that sunk into the ground.

The roof was proposed to be modeled after desert hills. Material excavated by constriction was proposed to be used for the stadium to be more sustainable. Lastly, the Rock Stadium was proposed to have a capacity of around 40000.

The Rock Stadium received attention from foreign media because of its unique design, and received several design awards. However, the stadium was never built.
